Henk Angenent (born 1 November 1967) is a retired Dutch speed skater, specialising in marathon skating and the longer distances. Angenent won the Elfstedentocht on 4 January 1997, outsprinting favourite Erik Hulzebosch at the finish.

On 12 March 2004 in Calgary, Angenent skated 41.669 km in one hour, which was the world record in this event until 15 March 2007, when Casper Helling skated 300 metres more. The previous world record was Roberto Sighel's 41.041 km from 24 March 1999. He won a 4th place at the 10,000 metres of the 2003 World Single Distance Championships, after Bob de Jong, Carl Verheijen and Lasse Sætre. Earlier that year he became Dutch champion on the same distance at the KNSB Dutch Single Distance Championships.

Angenent is a farmer, he grows mainly Brussels sprouts. After winning the Elfstedentocht many interviews were done with Angenent and this subject came up on many occasions. When marathon speedskating became more popular in the Netherlands and the Six Days of the Greenery were introduced, the overall leader of the race wears a Brussels sprout suit. So far he wore the suit himself once in the 2000–01 season. He wore the orange suit for the leader of the Essent Cup a total of 13 days. With his 21 career wins of speed skating marathons on artificial tracks he is ranked 11th together with Henk Portengen and K. C. Boutiette. He is however 3rd in the ranking of still active skaters, behind Jan Maarten Heideman and Cédric Michaud.

Results

Personal bests

Angenent has an Adelskalender score of 160.177 points.

References

External links 
 World records for one hour skating
 Personal records from Jakub Majerski's Speedskating Database

1967 births
Dutch male speed skaters
People from Woubrugge
Living people
Dutch farmers
Sportspeople from South Holland